The Bell 222 is an American twin-engine light helicopter built by Bell Helicopter. The Bell 230 is an improved development with different engines and other minor changes.

Development

Origins
In the late 1960s, Bell began designing a new twin-turbine engine light helicopter.  A mockup of the new helicopter was displayed in January 1974 at a helicopter convention.  Following interest at the convention the company announced the new Bell 222. It was the first light commercial twin-turbine helicopter developed in the United States.

The Bell 222 incorporated a number of advanced features including dual hydraulic and electrical systems, sponsons housing the retractable landing gear, and the Noda Matic vibration reduction system developed for the Bell 214ST.

Manufacturing began in 1975. The Model 222 first flew on August 13, 1976.  It received certification from the Federal Aviation Administration (FAA) on August 16, 1979 and was approved for visual flight rules (VFR) use on December 20, 1979.  Helicopter deliveries began on January 16, 1980.  The FAA approved the 222 for single-pilot instrument flight rules (IFR) operation on May 15, 1980.

Improved versions
The more powerful Bell 222B was introduced in 1982 with a larger diameter main rotor. The 222B-based Bell 222UT Utility Twin, with skid landing gear, was introduced in 1983.

A development of the 222 is the Bell 230, with the 222's LTS 101 engines replaced by two Allison 250 turboshaft engines, plus other refinements.  A converted 222 first flew as the prototype 230 on August 12, 1991. Transport Canada awarded certification in March 1992, and the first production 230 was delivered that November. The 230 had optional skid or wheel undercarriage. Production ended in 1995 with 38 having been built, being replaced in Bell's lineup by the stretched, more powerful Bell 430.

Design

The design includes two main rotor blades of stainless-steel-fiberglass construction and rotor hub with elastomeric bearings, which are lubricant free.  Its cabin holds a maximum of ten persons with one-two pilots and eight to nine passengers.  Seating configurations include standard seating for a pilot and seven passengers; or executive seating with one to two pilots and seating for five to six.  The Bell 222 and 230 are usually flown single-pilot (optional dual controls are available), and can be configured for corporate/executive, EMS or utility transport missions.

The Bell 222 is powered by twin Lycoming/Honeywell LTS101-650 turboshaft engines, rated at 592 shp each.  Later 222 versions feature more powerful engines.  Engine output is at 100% of rating at 9598 RPM. Two independent driveshafts deliver power from the engines to the transmission.  The Bell 222's LTS101 engine exhaust stacks are located at the rear of the engines, while the 230's Allison engine exhaust stacks are located high on the cowling. Fuel is stored in three tanks, one in the fuselage and one in each sponson. The main rear landing gear retracts into the sponsons.

The Bell 222's rotor systems include:
 Two-blade, semi-rigid high-kinetic energy main rotor with preconing and underslinging. The rotor head incorporates elastomeric bearings for hub springs, and flapping and pitch change bearings. The system is similar in design to that used by the AH-1 Cobra. Rotor speed at 100% engine speed is 348 RPM.
 All series models incorporate a pusher-type two-bladed tail rotor mounted on the left side of the tailboom, turning at 3396 RPM.

Variants

Bell 222 The original Model 222, sometimes unofficially called a Bell 222A to distinguish it from the Bell 222B. It was powered by two (618 hp takeoff rated, 591 hp max continuous rated) Honeywell (formerly Lycoming) LTS101-650C-3 turboshafts.
Bell 222B In 1982 the 222 was given a power upgrade (two Honeywell (formerly Lycoming) LTS101-750Cs with takeoff rating of 680 hp each), a larger main rotor, and was renamed the Bell 222B.
Bell 222B Executive This model had improved systems and a luxury interior.

Bell 222UT A 222B variant with skids, introduced in 1983. The lack of retractable landing gear allowed for larger auxiliary fuel tanks.

Bell D-292 The Advanced Composite Airframe Program (ACAP) was a 1985 all-composite LHX proof-of-concept project. The Bell D-292 used the Avco Lycoming engines, transmission, two-bladed main and tail rotors, tailboom, vertical fin, and rotor pylon of the 222. The D-292 had a new composite airframe.

Bell 230 In 1991, the 222B design was updated, given more uprated engines, and renamed the Bell 230. Production ended in 1995.
Bell 230 Executive Executive transport version.
Bell 230 Utility Utility transport version.
Bell 230 EMS Air ambulance version, equipped with one or two stretchers.

Bell 222SP During the 1990s, some Bell 222s were modified with the 222B's engines and 230's Allison 250-C30G engines for improved single engine (engine-out) performance, and redesignated as 222SPs.

Bell 430 In 1995 the Bell 430, a stretched 230 (adding another seating row), was launched, with uprated engines and a four-blade main rotor.

Operators

The Bell 222 has seen service with a large number of civil operators, but only limited military service. 

Albtransport (crashed in 2006)

Ecuadorian Navy

JDF Air Wing

Mercy Air

Specifications

Sources: Airliners.net, Helicopterdirect, others

Notable appearances in media

The Bell 222 is widely known from the television series Airwolf, where a modified 222A was featured.

See also

References

Bibliography

Bell 222/230 Field Maintenance Training Manual
Bell 222U Rotorcraft Flight Manual

External links 

Airliners.net: Bell 222 & 230
RTH.info: Bell 222 in aeromedical services (in English and German)
FAA Type Certificate Data Sheet

222/230
1970s United States helicopters
1970s United States civil utility aircraft
Twin-turbine helicopters
Aircraft first flown in 1976